Cindy Walker (July 20, 1917 – March 23, 2006) was an American songwriter, as well as a country music singer and dancer. She wrote many popular and enduring songs recorded by many artists.

She adopted a craftsman-like approach to her songwriting, often tailoring particular songs to specific artists. She produced a large body of songs that have been described as “direct, honest and unpretentious”. She had Top 10 hits spread over five decades.

She was inducted into the Country Music Hall of Fame in 1997, and the Texas Heritage Songwriters Hall of Fame in March 2011.

Early life
Cindy Walker was born on July 20, 1917, on her grandparents' farm near Mart, Texas (near Mexia, east of Waco), the daughter of a cotton-broker. Her maternal grandfather F.L. Eiland was a noted composer of hymns and her mother was a fine pianist. From childhood Cindy Walker was fond of poetry and wrote habitually.

Career

Beginnings
As a teenager, inspired by newspaper accounts of the dust storms on the American prairies in the mid-1930s, Walker wrote the song, "Dusty Skies" (later recorded by Bob Wills and the Texas Playboys).  In 1936, her "Casa de Mañana" was performed by the Paul Whiteman Orchestra (as part of the Texas Centennial celebrations).  By the end of the decade Cindy Walker was singing and dancing in Texas stage shows.

Move to Los Angeles
In 1940, Walker, at the age of 22, accompanied her parents on a business trip to Los Angeles. As they were driving down Sunset Boulevard she asked her father to stop the car near the Bing Crosby Enterprises building. Walker later recalled: "I had decided that if I ever got to Hollywood, I was going to try to show Bing Crosby a song I had written for him called 'Lone Star Trail'". Her father said "You're crazy, girl", but nonetheless stopped the car. Walker went inside the building to pitch her song and emerged shortly afterward to ask her mother to play the piano for her. Bing Crosby's brother Larry Crosby had agreed to listen to the song; Walker sang “Lone Star Trail” to him, accompanied by her mother. Larry Crosby was impressed and aware that his brother was looking for a new Western song to record. The next day Cindy played guitar and sang “Lone Star Trail” for Bing Crosby at Paramount Studios (where he was making a movie).  Crosby arranged for her to record a demo with Dave Kapp of Decca Records, who was also impressed and offered her a recording contract. "Lone Star Trail" was recorded and became a top-ten hit for Bing Crosby.

Performances and recordings
Walker remained in Los Angeles for 13 years. In 1940 she appeared as a singer in the Gene Autry Western Ride, Tenderfoot, Ride. The Decca recording contract led to Walker recording several songs with Texas Jim Lewis and His Lone Star Cowboys, including “Seven Beers with the Wrong Man” in 1941, which was also filmed as an early "Soundie" (a precursor of music videos). In 1944 Walker recorded a song (not her own) which became a top ten hit, “When My Blue Moon Turns to Gold Again”.

Focus on songwriting
Walker successfully pitched her songs to Bob Wills and began to regularly contribute compositions for recordings and the movies that Wills made in the 1940s. The collaboration was extremely fruitful: Bob Wills and the Texas Playboys eventually recorded over 50 of Cindy Walker's songs, including "Cherokee Maiden" (1941), "Dusty Skies" (1941), "Miss Molly" (1942), "Sugar Moon" (co-written with Bob Wills; 1947) and "Bubbles in My Beer" (1948). Bob Wills and his band performed Walker's first top-ten country hit, “You're From Texas” (1944).

Among her other 1940s hits were "Triflin' Gal" (top-10 records for both Al Dexter and Walter Shrum, 1945); "Warm Red Wine" (Ernest Tubb, 1949), and "Take Me in Your Arms and Hold Me" (Eddy Arnold, 1950). Some sources have erroneously attributed Johnny Bond's 1948 "Oklahoma Waltz" to her; probably confusing it with her own 1947 composition of that name, co-written with and recorded by Spade Cooley.

During the 1950s, Walker continued her success as a writer of popular songs. In 1952 Hank Snow had a hit with her "The Gold Rush Is Over" and in 1955 Webb Pierce had success with "I Don't Care".

Another Walker song was "Blue Canadian Rockies" recorded by Gene Autry (which featured in Autry's 1952 movie of the same name). The song was revived in 1968 by The Byrds on their influential country-rock album Sweetheart of the Rodeo. In 1955 Eddy Arnold pitched Walker the theme and the song-title for "You Don't Know Me" when they met during a WSM deejay convention in Nashville. Walker then wrote the song based on Arnold's idea, with both receiving songwriting credit for their contributions. It has been described as “a beautifully symmetrical and poignant portrait of a love not to be”.

"You Don't Know Me" has been recorded by numerous artists over the years, most successfully by Jerry Vale (1956); Lenny Welch (1960); Ray Charles (1962); and Elvis Presley (1967). "Anna Marie", was a hit for Jim Reeves in 1957 and the beginning of another productive artist-writer association which culminated in "This is It" (1965) and "Distant Drums" (a posthumous hit for Reeves). "Distant Drums" remained at No.1 on the British charts for five weeks in 1966.

Reeves recorded many of Walker's compositions; she often wrote specifically for him and offered him the right of first refusal of her tracks. "Distant Drums" was originally recorded by Reeves as a demo, simply because he loved the song. Chet Atkins felt the time was not right for an international release. This demo, like many for Reeves, was unearthed upon his death and along with Atkins and Mary Reeves, Walker oversaw the production of the overdub which was to be released in 1966, and became a huge international hit. 

In 1961 Eddy Arnold had a minor hit with Walker's "Jim, I Wore a Tie Today", a moving song about the death of a cowboy. Walker also wrote the song "Dream Baby (How Long Must I Dream)  ", which was recorded by Roy Orbison (who also recorded a version of "Distant Drums"). She originally had little confidence in “Dream Baby”, but Orbison's recording was a hit in both the US and Britain in 1962, and was a hit again in 1971 for Glen Campbell and in 1983 for Lacy J. Dalton. In 1964 Fred Foster of Monument Records "tempted her back into the studio to record an album, Words and Music by Cindy Walker. Walker's song "In the Misty Moonlight" was a hit for both Jerry Wallace (1964) and Dean Martin (1967) as well as being recorded by Jim Reeves. "Heaven Says Hello" (recorded by Sonny James) and "You Are My Treasure" (Jack Greene) were hits in 1968, both written by Walker.

Honors, awards and tributes
In 1970 Walker became a charter member of the Nashville Songwriters Hall of Fame. In 1981 Mickey Gilley's version of "You Don't Know Me" was a hit in the country charts. A year later Walker had her last major hit with Ricky Skaggs’ reworking of "I Don't Care".

It has been estimated that more than 500 of Walker’s songs have been recorded and that her songs made the Top 40 charts (country or pop) more than 400 times. In September 1997 Walker was inducted into the Country Music Hall of Fame (together another songwriter, Harlan Howard). During her acceptance speech, Walker recited some verse she had written for the occasion:In the 1980s, my mother bought me a dress for a BMI affair and she said “when they put you in the Hall of Fame, that's the dress I want you to wear.” And I said “Oh Mama, the Hall of Fame? Why that will never be.” And the years went by, but my mother's words remained in my memory. And I know tonight she'd be happy, though she's gone now to her rest. But I think of all that she did for me, and tonight I'm wearing this dress.
Her speech was followed by a standing ovation and Walker left the stage in tears after softly blowing a kiss. During the proceedings renowned songwriter (and fellow Hall of Fame inductee) Harlan Howard described Walker as "the greatest living songwriter of country music".

In 1998, Walker was inducted into the Texas Country Music Hall of Fame.  In 2002 the Country Music Television network honored the 40 Greatest Women in Country Music. The women were selected for their contribution to the genre by a survey of hundreds of American artists and music historians and Walker was ranked No. 32.

In March 2006, Willie Nelson released You Don't Know Me: The Songs of Cindy Walker, an album featuring 13 of Walker's well-known songs.

Personal life
In her personal life, Walker shunned the limelight. It was often reported that she never married, though in an interview with The New York Times shortly before her death, Walker stated she once had “a very short-lived marriage”. After her stint in Los Angeles she returned to Texas in 1954, living in Mexia in a modest three-bedroom house with her widowed mother, Oree.

Walker's custom was rising at dawn each day to write songs. She typed her lyrics on a pink-trimmed manual typewriter and Oree helped work out melodies for her daughter's words.  Each year Walker and her mother would operate from an apartment in Nashville for five months or so in order to market the songs. Oree Walker died in 1991. In a 2004 interview Walker stated: "I miss Mama every day".

Death
Walker died at age 87 near her home, at the Parkview Regional Hospital in Mexia, Texas, on March 23, 2006. She died seven days after Willie Nelson's tribute album to her was released. She had been ill for several weeks prior to her death. She was buried in the Mexia City Cemetery. Her family had a custom-designed sculpture created for her gravestone to honor the songwriter and her work. The memorial sculpture is a large pink-granite guitar (in her signature color).

Charting singles

See also 

 Mr. Texas (film 1951)

Notes

References
Oermann, Robert K. (1998). "Cindy Walker". In The Encyclopedia of Country Music. Paul Kinsgbury, Editor. New York: Oxford University Press. pp. 567–568.

External links 
 Cindy Walker – Country Music Hall of Fame and Museum
 Nashville Songwriters Hall of Fame: Cindy Walker
 Douglas Martin, "Obituaries: Cindy Walker, Songwriter" The New York Times, 29 March 2006.
 

1918 births
2006 deaths
People from Mart, Texas
American female dancers
Dancers from Texas
Singer-songwriters from Texas
American women country singers
American country singer-songwriters
Country Music Hall of Fame inductees
Monument Records artists
20th-century American singers
Country musicians from Texas
Cowgirl Hall of Fame inductees
20th-century American women singers
People from Mexia, Texas
20th-century American dancers
21st-century American women